Manihiki Island Airport is a public airport on the atoll of Manihiki in the Cook Islands. The airport was built in the early 1980s, but not used for commercial flights until 1991. Originally it had no terminal, with passengers checking in under the overhang of a nearby house and waiting in the open or in the shade of nearby trees. In 2018 construction began on a purpose-built terminal.

Airlines and destinations

Passenger

References

Airports in the Cook Islands
Manihiki